Cairn Bannoch is a mountain in the White Mounth, a mountainous plateau in the Scottish Highlands. It is about seventeen miles south of the River Dee near Balmoral.

References

Munros
Mountains and hills of the Eastern Highlands
Mountains and hills of Aberdeenshire
One-thousanders of Scotland